Mahmood Hasan (born 02 March 1897 ) was an academic who served as the 5th vice-chancellor of the University of Dhaka.

Early life and education
Hasan earned his bachelor's and master's in English from Presidency College, Calcutta in 1918 and 1920 respectively. He later got another master's degree and a Ph.D. degree in English from the Oxford University in 1926.

Career
In 1921, Hasan started his career as a lecturer in Cotton College, Guwahati and in the same year, he was appointed as a lecturer at the University of Dhaka, as a reader in 1926 and a professor in 1936.

Hasan served as the provost of Salimullah Muslim Hall in 1928. He became the chairman of the Dhaka Education Board in 1942. Eventually, he served as the vice-chancellor of the University of Dhaka from 1 July 1942 until 21 October 1948.

References

1897 births
Bengali educators
Presidency University, Kolkata alumni
Alumni of the University of Oxford
Academic staff of the University of Dhaka
Vice-Chancellors of the University of Dhaka
Vice-Chancellors of the University of Karachi
Year of death missing
Place of death missing